Madiha Umar (1908 – 2005 in Aleppo) was an Iraqi artist who was known for incorporating calligraphy with abstract art. She is generally perceived as the first Arab artist to have done this. Therefore, she is seen as the precursor to the Hurufiyya movement. Also, Umar was the first woman to receive a scholarship from the Iraqi government to study in Europe. Today her grandson Dara Kittani manages her Estate Collection. To see more about Madiha Umar go to her official website www.madihaumar.com

Life and career

Madiha Umar was born in Aleppo, Ottoman Empire, now Syria. Her father was Circassian and her mother was Syrian; mixed parentage was typical in the multicultural Turkish Empire. However, the family moved to Iraqi when she was a young girl. 
Umar attended the Sultaniyya School in Istanbul, where she drew praise from Ali Riza for her painting skills. She then trained as a teacher at the Maria Grey Training College in London in the 1930s, graduating with First class honours in Arts and Crafts in 1933. She then taught painting at the Academy of Fine Arts in Baghdad, becoming head of department before leaving in 1942. She became a naturalised Iraqi.

In 1939 she married Yasin Umar, a diplomat. In 1942 she moved to Washington, to accompany her husband, whose appointment as a member of the Iraqi Commission took him to the capital. In the US, she came across a book on Arabic calligraphy by Islamic scholar, Nabia Abbott and this inspired her to explore the possibilities of incorporating letters into her artwork.

She first began to explore the idea of integrating Arabic letters into painting in the 1940s and in 1949, with the encouragement of art historian, Richard Ettinghausen, she exhibited a series of 22 hurufist-inspired paintings at Georgetown Public Library in Washington. For this, she generally earns the reputation as the first Arab artist of the modern era to have incorporated Arabic letters into her art, and the first artist to have exhibited such works. Later in the same year, she wrote the book, Arabic Calligraphy: An Element of Inspiration in Abstract Art.

In 1952, Umar participated in the Ibn Sina exhibition, held at the Art Institute in Baghdad with 48 paintings, all of which employed Arabic letters in a modern, secular artwork. This event brought her work to the attention of Middle-Eastern artists. She has been variously acclaimed as the pioneer of a movement or as the precursor to the movement that now carries the name, Huryfiyya art movement.

She studied education at the George Washington University; then studied fine arts at the Corcoran School of Art, graduating in 1952 and received a MFA in 1959.

In 1971 she joined the One Dimension Group founded by Shakir Hassan Al Said; a group that sought to synthesise indigenous art with European trends and successfully bridged the gap between heritage and modernity.

See also

 Iraqi art
 Islamic art
 Islamic calligraphy
 List of Iraqi artists
 List of Iraqi women artists

References 

1908 births
2005 deaths
20th-century Iraqi painters
Abstract painters
Artists from Baghdad
Iraqi calligraphers
Iraqi contemporary artists
Iraqi women painters
20th-century women artists